"Words" is a song by Swedish DJ and producer Alesso, featuring vocals from fellow Swedish singer Zara Larsson. It was released on 22 April 2022 by 10:22PM and Astralwerks. "Words" was written and produced by Alesso, with co-writing from Larsson, Karen Ann Poole and Becky Hill. Further production was provided by Hampus Lindvall, who produced Larsson's vocals. The song received mostly positive reviews from critics and reached number 5 in Sweden and the top 40 in Flanders, Croatia, Hungary, the Netherlands, Norway, Poland and the United Kingdom.

Background and composition
"Words" is an EDM-pop and house-pop song, written by Alesso, Larsson, Karen Ann Poole and British singer Becky Hill. Alesso also produced the song with production of Larsson's vocals by Hampus Lindvall. It was recorded in both artists' home country of Sweden between December 2021 and January 2022. During an interview with Entertainment Tonight, Alesso and Larsson acknowledged that they had known each other for years but had never gotten around to collaborating previously, despite wanting to. Alesso explained his approach to approaching artists, "I always look for artists who can carry dance records". Prior to the release of "Words", or the confirmation of the collaboration, Alesso teased that his next single would feature a female vocalist via TikTok. The teasers featured coloured/artistic silhouettes, but fans immediately guessed that Larsson was going to be featured on the song. The "sultry" lyrics feature Larsson singing about the "words she can't tell a lover". V also noted the vulnerability in the lyrics.

"Words" was released on 22 April 2022. Alesso's VIP Mix of the song was released on 27 May 2022. Both versions of the song have been played during Alesso's Las Vegas residency at Tao.

Reception

Critics reviews
Drew Barkin from EDM Tunes praised Larsson's "glistening vocals" atop the "super catch" track, stating that their "only regret was that the song wasn't longer". Staff writing for Billboard included "Words" in their best dance songs of the week, praising it for helping to continue Alesso's "hot streak". Ellie Beeck of V called "Words" a "a radio-friendly dance song that is sure to be played at clubs everywhere this summer."

Commercial performance
"Words" peaked at number ten on the Billboard US Hot Dance/Electronic Songs chart, becoming his sixth top-ten single on the chart and on the US On the US Dance/Mix Show Airplay chart, it peaked at number four, Alesso's ninth top-five single on the chart.

Music video
The concept of the music video was a clash of worlds with imagery of Greek mythology. Alesso called the video a collaboration and mix of Alesso's world (rave) and Larsson's fashion and beauty. It was directed by Jason Lester and featured an ensemble cast.

Track listing
Digital download/streaming
"Words" (featuring Zara Larsson) – 2:22

Digital download/streaming – Alesso VIP Mix
"Words" (featuring Zara Larsson; Alesso VIP Mix) – 5:28

Personnel and credits

Song credits
Alesso – producer, mixer, programmer, engineer
Randy Merrill – mastering engineer, engineer
Zara Larsson – lead vocals
Hampus Lindvall – vocal producer

Music video credits
Adapted from YouTube.

Gus Bendinelli – cinematographer, colorist
Montana Bertoletti – lead man
Mitchell Brinker – BBG
Laura Burhenn – producer
Luis Cano – stylist (for Alesso)
Nikki Carmela – cast member
Karim Dakkon – key grip
Andy DeLuca – projection graphic designer
Eddie Diaz – BTS (for Alesso)
Erikx DiSantis – line producer, cast member
Chase DuBose – gaffer
Jake Dugger – 2nd AC, loader
Miguel Escalona – swing
David Goold – BBE
Ava Jones – production designer
Loies Kim – video commissioner
A Klass – cast member
Jason Lester – director, editor
Brianna Liebling – production manager
Maranda – hair stylist (for Zara Larsson)
James Marin – steadicam
Eric Moore – set dresser
Tyeri Morrison – cast member
Joe Mortimer – creative director
Grace Pae – make-up artist (for Zara Larsson)
Markelle Pike – cast member
Nikki Pittam – hair stylist (for Alesso)
Katie Qian – stylist (for Zara Larsson)
Jorge Ramos – cast member
Marlaine Reiner – groomer (for Alesso)
Brian Robins – cast member
Jordan Sakai – 1st AC
Matthew Sanchez – associate director
Grant Spanier – BTS
Drew Wall – set dresser
Wilder Yari – cast member

Charts

Weekly charts

Year-end charts

Certifications

Release history

References

Notes

Citations

2022 singles
2022 songs
Alesso songs
Zara Larsson songs
Songs written by Alesso
Songs written by Zara Larsson
Electronic dance music songs
House music songs
Pop songs
Songs written by Karen Poole
Songs written by Becky Hill
Song recordings produced by Alesso
Astralwerks singles